Alex Williams may refer to:
 Alex Williams (actor), Australian actor
 Alex Williams (alpine skier), American alpine skier
 Alex Williams (footballer, born 1961), English goalkeeper
 Alex Williams (footballer, born 1983), Scottish striker
 Alexander Williams (cartoonist), animator and cartoonist
 Alexander S. Williams, NYPD police inspector
 Alexander Williams, Jr. (born 1948), U.S. federal judge 
 Alex Williams (Australian footballer) (born 1993), Australian rules football player for Fremantle in the AFLW
 Alex Williams, co-author of Inventing the Future: Postcapitalism and a World Without Work

See also
Alex (disambiguation)
Williams (disambiguation)
Alexander Williams (disambiguation)
Alex Willian (born 1988) Brazilian soccer player